Robert Kakaha (born March 5, 1970), also known as Bob Zilla, is an American musician who is the bassist for rock band Hush Money. He is best known as the former bassist of heavy metal bands Damageplan and Hellyeah.

Life and career 
Kakaha was raised in the Silver Lake neighborhood of Los Angeles. He met Pantera guitarist "Dimebag" Darrell Abbott and drummer Vinnie Paul Abbott through tattooing. He also played with the rap rock band Hellafied Funk Crew, with Shadow Reichenstein, and Vanilla Ice.

Damageplan 

In 2003, the Abbott Brothers formed Damageplan after Pantera's breakup. Kakaha played bass, and former Halford guitarist Patrick Lachman on vocals. Damageplan recorded one album, New Found Power, which was released in February 2004. On December 8, 2004, Dimebag Darrell was shot onstage by former US marine Nathan Gale in Damageplan's tour at Alrosa Villa in Columbus, Ohio. Damageplan was split up after the death of Dimebag Darrell.

Hellyeah 

Three years later, Kakaha joined Hellyeah after original bassist Jerry Montano was dismissed from the band for violent behavior. Kakaha was brought in to play bass guitar on tour for all of 2007.

On February 13, 2014, it was announced that Kakaha had parted ways with the band.

Hush Money 
In January 2015, Kakaha joined Hush Money, a rock band from Dallas, Texas.

Personal life 
Kakaha is a resident of Dallas, Texas, where he tattoos at Iron Ink Tattoo in Irving, Texas.

Discography

Damageplan 
 New Found Power (2004)

Hellyeah 
 Stampede (2010)
 Band of Brothers (2012)

References

External links 
hellyeahband.com
damageplan.com (archived)
damageplan.net (archived)

Living people
1970 births
American heavy metal bass guitarists
American male bass guitarists
Hellyeah members
Guitarists from Los Angeles
American male guitarists
Damageplan members
21st-century American bass guitarists